Boyd Field  is a privately owned, public use airport located eight nautical miles (15 km) west of the central business district of Waco, in McLennan County, Texas, United States.

Facilities 
Boyd Field covers an area of 33 acres (13 ha) at an elevation of 570 feet (174 m) above mean sea level. It has two runways, designated 3/21 and 5/23, each with a turf surface measuring 1,950 by 60 feet (594 x 18 m).

References

External links 
  at Texas DOT Airport Directory
 Aerial photo as of January 1995 from USGS The National Map via MSR Maps
 Aeronautical chart at SkyVector

Defunct airports in Texas
Airports in Texas
Transportation in McLennan County, Texas